Nigel Guy Wilson (born 23 July 1935) is a British scholar, emeritus fellow and tutor in Classics, Lincoln College, Oxford. His field of research is ancient Greek history, language and literature, and culture, art and archaeology of the Byzantine world. Since retiring in 2002 he has continued his researches into Greek palaeography, textual criticism and the history of classical scholarship. In the series of Oxford Classical Texts his edition of Aristophanes appeared in 2007, and a new edition of Herodotus for the same series appeared in 2015.  Another substantial piece of work was a contribution to the study of the famous Archimedes Palimpsest, which was sold at auction in New York in 1998 for $2,000,000; the results of a collaboration lasting ten years and involving experts in various fields appeared in The Archimedes palimpsest (Cambridge University Press 2011), which was described by the reviewer in the TLS as "the most beautiful book produced in this century".

Published works
1963 Manuscripts of Byzantine chant in Oxford (with D. I. Stefanovic) 
1968 (4th ed. 2014) - Scribes and Scholars: A Guide to the Transmission of Greek and Latin Literature (Oxford University Press) (with L. D. Reynolds)
1969 Scholia in Aristophanis Equites (with D. Mervyn Jones) 
1971 - An Anthology of Byzantine Prose (De Gruyter)
1972–3 (2nd ed. 2014) - Mediaeval Greek Bookhands: Examples Selected from Greek Manuscripts in Oxford Libraries (Medieval Academy of America)
1975 - St Basil on Greek literature
1975 - Scholia in Aristophanis Acharnenses
1981 - Menander Rhetor (with Donald A. Russell)
1983 (2nd ed. 1996) - Scholars of Byzantium (The Johns Hopkins University Press)
1990 - Sophoclis Fabulae  (Oxford Classical Texts of Sophocles, with Hugh Lloyd-Jones)
1990 - Sophoclea (with Hugh Lloyd-Jones) 
1992 (2nd edition 2017) From Byzantium to Italy: Greek Studies in the Italian Renaissance (The Johns Hopkins University Press)
1994 Photius: the Bibliotheca 
1997 - Aelian: Historical Miscellany (Loeb Classical Library No. 486) (Harvard University Press)
1997 - Sophocles: second thoughts (with Hugh Lloyd-Jones)
2003 Pietro Bembo, Oratio pro litteris graecis 
2005 - Encyclopedia of Ancient Greece (Routledge)
2007 - Aristophanis Fabulae (Oxford Classical Text of Aristophanes, OUP)
2007 - Aristophanea
2011 - The Archimedes Palimpsest (Cambridge University Press)
2011 - A Descriptive Catalogue of the Greek Manuscripts of Corpus Christi College, Oxford (D. S. Brewer)
2014 - Mediaeval Greek Bookhands: Examples Selected from Greek Manuscripts in Oxford Libraries (Medieval Academy of America)
2015 - Herodoti Historiae (Oxford Classical Text of Herodotus, OUP)
2015 - Herodotea

References

1935 births
Living people
British classical scholars
Academics of the University of Oxford
Fellows of Lincoln College, Oxford
Fellows of the British Academy